United Nations Security Council resolution 549, adopted on 19 April 1984, after recalling previous resolutions on the topic, as well as studying the report by the Secretary-General on the United Nations Interim Force in Lebanon (UNIFIL) approved in 426 (1978), the Council decided to extend the mandate of UNIFIL for a further six months until 19 October 1984.

The Council then reemphasised the mandate of the Force and requested the Secretary-General to report back on the progress made with regard to the implementation of the resolution.

Resolution 549 was adopted by 13 votes to none, with two abstentions from the Ukrainian Soviet Socialist Republic and Soviet Union.

See also 
 1982 Lebanon War
 Israeli–Lebanese conflict
 Lebanese Civil War
 List of United Nations Security Council Resolutions 501 to 600 (1982–1987)
 South Lebanon conflict (1985–2000)

References
Text of the Resolution at undocs.org

External links
 

 0549
 0549
Israeli–Lebanese conflict
1984 in Israel
1984 in Lebanon
 0549
April 1984 events